Synomera is a genus of moths of the family Erebidae. The genus was described by Schaus in 1916.

Species
Synomera alcis (Schaus, 1914) French Guiana
Synomera corazalis Schaus, 1916 Panama
Synomera crafti Schaus, 1916 Panama
Synomera cyllarus Schaus, 1916 French Guiana
Synomera francalis (Schaus, 1906) Brazil (São Paulo)
Synomera hylonome Schaus, 1916
Synomera isthmialis Schaus, 1916 Panama
Synomera pedroalis Schaus, 1916 Brazil (Rio de Janeiro)
Synomera procrustes Schaus, 1916 French Guiana
Synomera tanga Schaus, 1916 Trinidad
Synomera tatalga Schaus, 1916 Brazil (São Paulo)

References

Herminiinae